The Cameron Highlands is a district in Pahang, Malaysia, occupying an area of . To the north, its boundary touches that of Kelantan; to the west, it shares part of its border with Perak. It is the smallest municipality in the state.

Surveyed by the government geologist and explorer William Cameron in 1885, the outpost consists of three mukims (subdistricts), namely Ringlet, Tanah Rata and Ulu Telom. Its eight settlements are Ringlet, Tanah Rata (the administrative centre), Brinchang, the Bertam Valley, Kea Farm, Tringkap, Kampung Kuala Terla, Kampung Raja and Blue Valley.

Developed in the 1930s, the tableland is one of the oldest tourist spots in Malaysia. Apart from its tea estates, the plateau is noted for its cool weather, orchards, nurseries, farmlands, waterfalls, rivers, lakes, wildlife, mossy forest, golf course, hotels, places of worship, bungalows, Land Rovers,  museum and native inhabitants (Orang Asli).

Background
The Cameron Highlands were named after William Cameron, a British explorer and geologist  who was commissioned by the then colonial government to map out the Pahang-Perak border area in 1885.

In a statement concerning his mapping expedition, Cameron mentioned he saw "a sort of vortex on the mountains, while for a (reasonably) wide area we have gentle slopes and plateau land." When approached, Sir Hugh Low, the Resident of Perak (1887–1889), expressed the wish of developing the region into a "sanatorium, health resort and open farmland." A narrow path to Cameron Highlands was then carved through the jungle. Nothing much happened after that.

Forty years later, the tableland was given another review when Sir George Maxwell (1871–1959) visited the locale to see if it could be turned into a resort. He spent about nine days surveying the territory. Maxwell described the terrain as being "somewhat oval in shape on his return from the highlands." After comparing it with Nuwara Eliya in Sri Lanka and Baguio in the Philippines, he decreed that the site should be developed into a hill station.

In mid-1925, an Agricultural Experiment Station was set up to confirm if cinchona, tea, coffee, fruits and vegetables could be grown at the district. In December 1925, a superintendent was appointed to supervise the 200-acre (81-ha) plantation on Mount Beremban. While research at the station was being carried out, the colonial office assigned Captain C.C. Best, a surveyor from the Federated Malay States to trace the Telom River (Malay: Sungei Telom). The Annual Report of the Survey Department (1925) states he explored "the Ulu of the Telom which was the actual area traversed by Cameron" and "he went first to what is known as Cameron Highlands to obtain a basis of comparison and from there crossed over into the Telom Valley. He made a reconnaissance map of the headwaters of the Telom and his exploration has established definitely that the area at the Ulu of the Bertang (Bertam?) is incomparably the most suitable for development." This report, coupled with the confirmation that tea could also be grown, gave the British the motivation to develop the place.

In 1926, a development committee was formed to zone off the moorlands agriculture, defense, administration, housing, and recreation. Later, a three-million-dollar road was constructed from Tapah to the highlands. It started from the 19th mile Tapah-Pahang Road and ended at Ginting "B" (Tanah Rata). The three-year contract was awarded to Messrs. Fogden, Brisbane and Company. The first installment of $250,000 was made in 1926. The project commenced on 1 January 1928; it was completed on Friday, 14 November 1930 – 47 days ahead of schedule. The building of the road was a challenge: the crew not only had to deal with the weather; they also had to cope with the risk of being struck down with malaria. The manning level varied from 500 to 3,000 workers during the construction stage. Throughout the contract, 375 employees were hospitalized for fever. The biggest problem faced by the contractor was the haulage of heavy equipment from the lowlands to the upper reaches. This setback was overcome with the use of steam-driven locomotives which were designed for work on steep gradients.

When the road was opened in 1931, the British and the locals moved in to settle on the slopes of the mountain. They were soon followed by tea planters and vegetable growers who found the climate to be suitable for the growth of their crops. On 1 July 1931, Cameron Highlands was made an autonomous sub-district under Kuala Lipis, with its own Deputy District Officer subordinate to the Lipis District Officer. By the mid-1930s, there was a notable improvement in the constituency: it now had a six-hole golf course, several cottages, three inns, a police post, two boarding schools, a military camp, a dairy, a horse spelling ranch, nurseries, vegetable farms, tea plantations, a Government Rest House and an Agricultural Experiment Station. The domain continued to grow until the outbreak of the Second World War. During the Japanese Occupation of the Malay Peninsula (1942–1945), there was hardly any development in the area. When the Japanese withdrew in August 1945, the place transformed. This, however, came to a halt during the Malayan Emergency (1948–1960). When the conflict ended, Cameron Highlands" experienced a constant change in its landscape. Today, the haven is not only the biggest and best known of Malaysia's hill stations; it is also the highest point in Peninsular Malaysia accessible by car.

Climate
The climate of the Cameron Highlands is on the border between a tropical rainforest climate (Köppen climate classification Af) and a subtropical highland climate (Köppen climate classification Cfb).

Demographics

The district has a diverse population of 33,278 people. It comprises Chinese (13,099), Bumiputeras (12,989) — Malays (7,321); others (mainly Orang Aslis (5,688) — Indians (6,988), non-Malaysian citizens (5,193), and other nationalities (202). Most of the residents are entrepreneurs, service industry employees, farm workers, retirees or government servants.

Politics
Previously contested as part of Kuala Lipis, parliamentary representation for Cameron Highlands was granted in 2004. Though named as such, the Cameron Highlands also covers a few areas that are outside the ward. For instance, the FELDA settlement of Sungai Koyan, which is represented by the Cameron Highlands in the federal parliament, is located in the district of Kuala Lipis. The Cameron Highlands itself contributes two seats to the Pahang State Legislative Assembly — Tanah Rata and Jelai. The Tanah Rata constituency covers the entire district of the Cameron Highlands; the Jelai constituency covers the western part of Kuala Lipis which includes Sungai Koyan and some other FELDA settlements.

Geography

The Cameron Highlands is one of the 11 districts of Pahang. It is unlike any other constituency in Malaysia; it is not only home to hundreds of floral species that are rare to the tropics, but it is also an area with a substantially different ecosystem.

In 1958, the outpost was declared as deer reserve. Four years later, it became a venue affording protection to animals and birds. The humidity is high with no marked dry seasons. Its wettest months are from October to November; its "driest" period is from January to February.

Cameron Highlands is one of the few places in Malaysia that serves as a habitat for a wide variety of flora and fauna. There are more than 700 species of plants that grow here. The vegetation changes as one ascends the mountain. The ward is known for its tea growing, vegetable farms and flower nurseries. Its woodlands form the prevailing natural ecosystem within and around the prefecture. Of the fauna, the Sumatran serow, mountain peacock-pheasant and Malayan whistling-thrush are listed in the 2004 IUCN Red List of Threatened Species.

Geographically, the resort is located on the highland "spine" of Peninsular Malaysia. There are eight mountains at the retreat. They are Mount (Malay: Gunung) Batu Brinchang, Mount Berembun, Mount Irau, Mount Jasar, Mount Mentigi, Mount Perdah and Mount Siku. Mount Swettenham is located on its border with Kelantan. At the top of Mount Batu Brinchang is a radio and television station. It was constructed by the British in the early 1950s. Close to it is the mossy forest. The trail to the forest starts from the Sungei Palas Boh Tea Plantation. It takes about 15 minutes to reach the cloud forest by road.

Cameron Highlands is unique compared to the other hill stations in Malaysia — three river systems drain it with numerous tributaries (totaling 123). Their high points serve as the water catchment for the Pahang and Perak rivers (Malay: Sungai Pahang and Sungai Perak).

Overall, much of the retreat is still forested (estimated at 71%). Jungle trails lead visitors to tranquil spots, waterfalls, and aboriginal villages. Most of the tracks begin at Tanah Rata. There are more than ten paths to pick and choose from. Depending on its distance, some routes can take as long as five hours to cover. Apart from its numerous walks, the sanctuary is also known for its native inhabitants, the Orang Asli, who rely on the land for subsistence farming, hunting, and fishing. Many have left to take up residence in the nearby towns. There are still some who prefer to treat the woods as their home. To date, there have been many changes at the resort. During the colonial era, the county was developed to be "a healthy hill station similar to Nuwara Eliya." Today, it is different. During the Post-Independence Period (1957–1973), vast tracts of land were cleared for agriculture and infrastructure development. After 1974, more land was cleared for agriculture, housing projects, power plants, logging activities, livestock farming, hotel construction, small-scale industries, human resettlement, and road building. There is no doubt that some advances have brought economic benefits. This, however, has come with a price. Over the years, the "development (in this area) has been at the expense of the weather and the environment," as well as the indigenous communities' consent.

Transportation
The Cameron Highlands can be accessed by road via Tapah, Simpang Pulai, Gua Musang or Sungai Koyan. Tapah and Simpang Pulai are the two approaches from Perak. Gua Musang and Sungai Koyan are the entryways from Kelantan and Pahang, respectively.

Car
Until the 1990s the only access road to the Cameron Highlands was by Federal Route 59 which begins in Tapah, Perak. In 2004, a new access road was opened —  Federal Route 185 —  connecting Simpang Pulai (about a kilometre south of Ipoh, Perak) through the northern part of the Highlands and Gua Musang in southern Kelantan before terminating in Kampung Kuala Jenderis in Hulu Terengganu, Terengganu.

By 2010 a third access route was opened — Federal Route 102 — connecting Ringlet to FELDA Sungai Koyan, near Kuala Lipis. With the opening of this route, motorists from the other parts of Pahang (especially Kuantan) are now able to access the district of  Cameron Highlands without having to leave the state. There is another route to the hill station — the Pahang State Route (C5). It links Sungai Koyan to Raub which is the gateway to Fraser's Hill.

Public transportation
As with most of western Pahang, the Cameron Highlands is not served by any KTM railway station, the closest being in Kuala Lipis and Tapah Road. Nevertheless, several bus services connect the Highlands to the cities and towns, such as Singapore, Kuala Lumpur, Ipoh, Penang and Tapah.

Federal Parliament and State Assembly Seats 

List of Cameron Highlands district representatives in the Federal Parliament (Dewan Rakyat)

List of Cameron Highlands district representatives in the State Legislative Assembly (Dewan Undangan Negeri)

See also
 Geography of Malaysia
 Environment of Malaysia
 Landmarks in Cameron Highlands
 Settlements in Cameron Highlands

References

Notes

Books

External links

 Cameron Highlands Website
 Official website of Cameron Highlands District Council
 Official website of Regional Environmental Awareness Cameron Highlands (R.E.A.C.H.)
 Rancangan Tempatan Daerah Cameron Highlands 2030 (Penggantian)

 
Hills of Malaysia
Hill stations in Malaysia
Landforms of Pahang
Titiwangsa Mountains
Tourist attractions in Pahang
Highlands